Monsters vs. Aliens is a 2009 video game based on the film with the same name. The game was released on March 24, 2009 on PlayStation 2, Nintendo DS, Xbox 360, PlayStation 3, Wii, and Microsoft Windows.

The game, developed by Beenox on all platforms except the Nintendo DS which was developed by Amaze Entertainment, allows users to play through scenes from the movie as Ginormica, B.O.B., and The Missing Link, and features drop-in/out co-op.

Actors who reprised their roles from the film include  Reese Witherspoon, Seth Rogen, Will Arnett, and Rainn Wilson.

Gameplay
Players take control of B.O.B., Missing Link, Dr. Cockroach PH.D. and Ginormica/Susan Murphy in all platforms, as well as Insectosaurus on the Nintendo DS version of the game. Each level is divided into multiple stages in which the player takes control of each monster's unique abilities to fight off enemies. The Missing Link can stick to the sides of large robotic bosses, take control of missile turrets, and outwit his opponents with superior acrobatic skills. B.O.B. has to solve complex puzzles one step at a time in 3-D mazes, can turn floating plasma generators into personal turrets, slide through grates and use enemies as living key cards/ammunition. Ginormica can use cars, Jeeps and hover platforms as roller skates to dash, kick, jump, and duck enemies and fight all bosses to devastate enemies. If the player chooses co-op mode, Dr. Cockroach can either appear as a secondary player with B.O.B. or deploy his "Multiplayer Drone", which can shoot obstacles, enemies, and other items. Dr. Cockroach also has a "DNA Lab", where he uses Monster DNA collected throughout the game to purchase upgrades, extra content (3D models, concept art, etc.), and extra levels. The music was composed by Jim Dooley, with live brass recorded at the Warner Brothers Eastwood Scoring Stage.

Plot
The player starts out trapped in a monster containment facility under the command of General W. R. Monger, with Insectosaurus, Susan (A.K.A. Ginormica,) B.O.B., The Missing Link, and Dr. Cockroach. Susan breaks a wall and the monsters escape and disable a giant anti-monster robot known as the US Avenger, but are recaptured by Monger, who is accompanied by a force of soldiers, tanks, and helicopters. Meanwhile, a giant crater appears, around which the military puts blockades and the President of the US tries to negotiate with an alleged extraterrestrial being. The crater explodes, and a giant alien robot probably the size of Insectosaurus emerges and begins destroying everything. Monger makes a deal with the monsters, promising freedom in return for the monsters' help in stopping the robot.

Reception
The game received mixed to positive reviews from critics. The PlayStation 2 version of the game received a 64/100 from Metacritic, and the Xbox 360 received 63/100. All platforms scored 5/10 at IGN, with an exception for the Nintendo DS version, which scored a 3/10.

References

External links
 
 
 

2009 video games
Cooperative video games
Games for Windows certified games
Nintendo DS games
PlayStation 2 games
PlayStation 3 games
Video games based on films
Video games developed in Canada
Video games scored by James Dooley (composer)
Wii games
Windows games
Xbox 360 games
Beenox games
Monsters vs. Aliens (franchise)
Activision games
Amaze Entertainment games
Multiplayer and single-player video games